New Hope A.R.P. Church and Session House is a historic Associate Reformed Presbyterian Church building and Session House located near Winnsboro, Fairfield County, South Carolina.  They were built about 1886.  The meeting house form church is a one-story, weatherboarded, frame church. It features a bracketed belfry with a bellcast roof. The session house is a 10 by 12 foot weatherboarded frame building with a gable roof.

It was added to the National Register of Historic Places in 1984.

References

Presbyterian churches in South Carolina
Churches on the National Register of Historic Places in South Carolina
Churches completed in 1886
19th-century Presbyterian church buildings in the United States
Churches in Fairfield County, South Carolina
National Register of Historic Places in Fairfield County, South Carolina
Associate Reformed Presbyterian Church